The parish of Christ Episcopal Church in Red Wing, Minnesota, United States, was founded in 1858.  A wooden building was erected that served the early parish well, but by 1868 it was felt that the growth of the parish made the building of a larger church a necessity.

In the autumn of that year work began on the new building, constructed in Gothic Revival style following plans furnished by New York architect Henry C. Dudley. 
 D.C. Hill was contracted to do the basic carpentry work; George H. Davis provided the finished carpentry (seats, columns, tracery, wainscoting; all of butternut finished in oil).
 G.A. Carlson carried out the stonework with magnesian limestone from his quarries.
 The windows were furnished by a ”Mr. Sharpe from New York.”

The cornerstone was laid June 24, 1869 and the new church was consecrated by Bishop Henry Benjamin Whipple on December 19, 1871.  (Due to concerns about the foundations, the steeple was not added until 1897.)

The church is now a contributing property to the Red Wing Mall Historic District, which is listed on the National Register of Historic Places.

References

External links 
 
 Christ Episcopal Church (Red Wing, MN)

Churches in Goodhue County, Minnesota
Episcopal church buildings in Minnesota
Historic district contributing properties in Minnesota
Red Wing, Minnesota
National Register of Historic Places in Goodhue County, Minnesota
Churches on the National Register of Historic Places in Minnesota